Urban legend normally refers to a modern folklore, compelling stories often thought to be factual by those who circulate them.

Urban legend may also refer to:

Films and television
Urban Legend (film), a 1998 film
Urban Legends: Final Cut, a 2000 film, the first sequel to the 1998 Urban Legend film
Urban Legends: Bloody Mary, a 2005 film, the second sequel to the 1998 Urban Legend film
Rudy Giuliani: Urban Legend, a film criticizing former New York City Mayor Rudy Giuliani
Urban Legends (TV series), a 2007 television series broadcast on the Biography Channel

Music
Urban Legend (album), a 2004 album by rapper T.I.
Urban Legend (musicians), musical artist with members J-Radical and Kool Kojac
Urban Legend, a 2011 psytrance album by Vibe Tribe

See also
Urban Myths
Urban Tales